At the 1948 Winter Olympics, four speed skating events were contested.

Medal summary

Participating nations
Twelve speed skaters competed in all four events.

A total of 68 speed skaters from 15 nations competed at the St. Moritz Games:

Medal table

References

External links
International Olympic Committee results database
 

 
1948 Winter Olympics events
1948
Olympics, 1948